Guru Gobind Singh Bhawan is an iconic landmark building located at Punjabi University, Patiala. The foundation stone of Bhawan was laid down by the then President of India, Zakir Hussain on 27 December 1967. The foundation was laid during the 300th birth anniversary celebrations of 10th Sikh Guru Guru Gobind Singh.

References

External links
 Guru Gobind Singh Bhawan @YouTube
 Punjabi University, Patiala
  Wikimapia Link of Punjabi University

Punjabi University
Buildings and structures in Punjab, India
Tourist attractions in Patiala
University and college buildings in India
Memorials to Guru Gobind Singh